This is a list of events occurring in Antarctica in 2023.

Events 
Ongoing: COVID-19 pandemic in Antarctica

 February 15: A joint study by the British Antarctic Survey and the US Antarctic programme finds that glaciers on the icy continent may be more sensitive to changes in sea temperature than previously thought. Researchers used sensors and an underwater robot beneath the Thwaites glacier to study melting.
 February 16: The National Snow and Ice Data Center of the United States reports that the Antarctic sea ice decreased to 1.91 million square kilometers (740,000 sq mi) within the week, the smallest since records began in 1979.

References 

2020s in Antarctica
Years of the 21st century in Antarctica